Pseudophilautus  nasutus (commonly known as the sharp-snout pygmy tree frog) was a species of frog in the family Rhacophoridae.
It was endemic to Sri Lanka where it is extinct, though it might occur or have occurred in India too.

References

nasutus
Frogs of Sri Lanka
Endemic fauna of Sri Lanka
Extinct amphibians
Amphibian extinctions since 1500
Amphibians described in 1868
Taxa named by Albert Günther
Taxonomy articles created by Polbot